12th Infantry Regiment may refer to:

12th Infantry Regiment (Poland)
12th Infantry Regiment (South Korea)
12th Infantry Regiment (United States)
12th Regiment of Foot